Sextilis ("sixth") or mensis Sextilis was the Latin name for what was originally the sixth month in the Roman calendar, when March (Martius, "Mars' month") was the first of ten months in the year. After the calendar reform that produced a twelve-month year, Sextilis became the eighth month, but retained its name. It was renamed Augustus (August) in 8 BC in honor of the first Roman emperor, Augustus. Sextilis followed Quinctilis, which was renamed Julius (July) after Julius Caesar, and preceded September (from septem, "seven"), which was originally the seventh month.

The month Augustus
Julius (July) was renamed from Quintilis ("fifth" month) in honor of Julius Caesar, who had adopted his grand-nephew Octavian, the future Augustus, and made him his heir.  It has sometimes been thought that the month has 31 days because Augustus wanted as many days in his month as in his predecessor's, but Sextilis in fact had 31 days since the reform during Caesar's dictatorship that created the Julian calendar.

The decree of the Senate (senatus consultum) renaming Sextilis reads in part:

Whereas the emperor Augustus Caesar, in the month of Sextilis, was first admitted to the consulate, and thrice entered the city in triumph, and in the same month the legions, from the Janiculum, placed themselves under his auspices, and in the same month Egypt was brought under the authority of the Roman people, and in the same month an end was put to the civil wars; and whereas for these reasons the said month is, and has been, most fortunate to this empire, it is hereby decreed by the senate that the said month shall be called Augustus.

Iconography of the month
The Calendar of Filocalus illustrated the month of August with a seasonal representation of summer's heat. A peacock fan overhangs a nude male who drinks from a large bowl, with his cast-off garment in the top right corner. The amphora beside him is sealed with a flower and in one extant copy is inscribed ZLS, probably a mistaken transcription for the Greek exhortation zeses, "to your health". Three mature gourds or melons are another seasonal motif.

Dates

The Romans did not number days of a month sequentially from the 1st through the last day. Instead, they counted back from the three fixed points of the month: the Nones (5th or 7th, depending on the length of the month), the Ides (13th or 15th), and the Kalends (1st) of the following month. The Nones of August was the 5th, and the Ides the 13th. The last day of August was the pridie Kalendas Septembris, "day before the Kalends of September". Roman counting was inclusive; 9 August was ante diem V Idūs Sextilīs (ante diem V Idūs Augustas), "the 5th day before the Ides of August," usually abbreviated a.d. V Id. Sext. (a.d. V Id. Aug.), or with the a.d. omitted altogether. The Julian calendar reform added two days to Sextilis; thus on the pre-reform calendar, 23 August was VIII Kal. Sept., "the 8th day before the Kalends of September," but on the Julian calendar X Kal. Sept., "the 10th day before the Kalends of September".

On the calendar of the Roman Republic and early Principate, each day was marked with a letter to denote its religiously lawful status. In August, these were:
 F for dies fasti, days when it was legal to initiate action in the courts of civil law;
 C, for dies comitalis, a day on which the Roman people could hold assemblies (comitia), elections, and certain kinds of judicial proceedings;
 N for dies nefasti, when these political activities and the administration of justice were prohibited;
 NP, the meaning of which remains elusive, but which marked feriae, public holidays;
 EN for endotercissus, an archaic form of intercissus, "cut in half," meaning days that were nefasti in the morning, when sacrifices were being prepared, and in the evening, while sacrifices were being offered, but were fasti in the middle of the day.

Days were also marked with nundinal letters in cycles of A B C D E F G H, to mark the "market week" (these are omitted in the table below).

A dies natalis was an anniversary such as a temple founding or rededication, sometimes thought of as the "birthday" of a deity. During the Imperial period, some of the traditional festivals localized at Rome became less important, and the birthdays and anniversaries of the emperor and his family gained prominence as Roman holidays. On the calendar of military religious observances known as the Feriale Duranum, sacrifices pertaining to Imperial cult outnumber the older festivals. After the mid-1st century AD, a number of dates are added to calendars for spectacles and games (circenses) held in honor of various deities in the venue called a "circus". By the late 2nd century AD, extant calendars no longer show days marked with letters (F, N, C and so on) to show their religious status, probably in part as a result of calendar reforms undertaken by Marcus Aurelius. Festivals marked in large letters on extant fasti, represented by festival names in all capital letters on the table, are thought to have been the most ancient holidays, becoming part of the calendar before 509 BC.

Unless otherwise noted, the dating and observances on the following table are from H.H. Scullard, Festivals and Ceremonies of the Roman Republic (Cornell University Press, 1981), pp. 169–182. After the Ides, dates are given for the Julian calendar, with pre-Julian dates noted parenthetically for festivals.

References

August
Months of the Roman calendar